Taze is a town in Shwebo District, Sagaing Division in Myanmar.

References

External links
 "Taze Map — Satellite Images of Taze" Maplandia
 

Township capitals of Myanmar
Populated places in Sagaing Region